The Babes in the Woods is a 1917 American silent fantasy film directed by Chester M. Franklin and Sidney Franklin and starring Francis Carpenter, Virginia Lee Corbin and Violet Radcliffe.

Cast
 Francis Carpenter as Roland / Hansel 
 Virginia Lee Corbin as Rose / Gretel 
 Violet Radcliffe as The Robber Prince 
 Carmen De Rue The Good Fair
 Herschel Mayall as John Hamilton 
 Rosita Marstini as Mrs. Hamilton 
 Robert Lawler as Mason Hamilton 
 Scott McKee as The Butler 
 Ted Billings as The Witch 
 Buddy Messinger
 Charles Gorman 
 Jack R. Hall
 Gertrude Messinger
 Marie Messinger
 Raymond Lee

References

Bibliography
 Solomon, Aubrey. The Fox Film Corporation, 1915-1935: A History and Filmography. McFarland, 2011.

External links
 

1917 films
1910s fantasy films
American silent feature films
American fantasy films
American black-and-white films
Films directed by Chester Franklin
Films directed by Sidney Franklin
Fox Film films
1910s English-language films
1910s American films